Chuncheon Stadium was a multi-purpose stadium located in Chuncheon, Gangwon-do, South Korea. It was built in 1980 to hold Korean Junior Sports Festival. It also held Korean National Sports Festival twice, in 1985 and 1996. The stadium had a capacity of 35,000 people. In December 2008, because of the deterioration of its equipment, the stadium was demolished, and a new stadium, Chuncheon Stadium, was built in another place.

See also 
 Chuncheon Songam Sports Town

External links
 Chuncheon Sports Facilities Management Center 
 World Stadiums

Chuncheon
Defunct football venues in South Korea
Multi-purpose stadiums in South Korea
Sports venues completed in 1980
Sports venues demolished in 2008
Sports venues in Gangwon Province, South Korea
Ulsan Hyundai FC